Kam slunce nechodí is a 1971 Czechoslovak film. The film stars Josef Kemr.

References

External links
 

1971 films
Czechoslovak comedy films
1970s Czech-language films
Czech comedy films
1970s Czech films